FIDA may refer to:

Acronyms
Federacion Internacional de Abogadas (International Federation of Women Lawyers)
International Fund for Agricultural Development (Fonds international de développement agricole)
Islamic Front for Armed Jihad (Front Islamique du Djihad Armé), an organization during the Algerian Civil War
Palestinian Democratic Union (Al-Ittihad al-Dimuqrati al-Filastini)
Federal Independent Democratic Alliance, a front organization used by South Africa's apartheid-era government

Other uses
Fida, a 2004 Indian Hindi film
Fida International, Finnish non-governmental humanitarian organization
Fida (name), an Arabic given name